Thanh Nghiem is a French engineer. She was a partner at McKinsey & Company.

Life 
She graduated from École des Mines de Paris, and INSEAD.
She became a partner at McKinsey, France.
She is a management consultant.

She founded the Angenius Institute.

Works 
Des abeilles et des hommes : Passerelles pour un monde libre et durable, Bayard Jeunesse, 2010. 
Cedric Villani, Thanh Nghiem Le manifeste du crapaud fou, Massot Editions, 2017.

References

External links
 Thanh Nghiem : Investir les médias pour appeler à l'action positive, Onpassealacte!, March 8, 2018

 Thanh Nghiem Des paillettes à l’être, TEDxAlsace,

Living people
McKinsey & Company people
Year of birth missing (living people)
French women engineers
21st-century French engineers
Mines Paris - PSL alumni
INSEAD alumni
French people of Vietnamese descent
21st-century French women